The 41st Annual Japan Record Awards took place on December 31, 1999, starting at 6:30PM JST. The primary ceremonies were televised in Japan on TBS.

Award winners 
Japan Record Award:
Glay for "Winter, Again"
Best Vocalist:
Hiromi Go
Best New Artist:
Amika Hattan
Best Album:
Hikaru Utada for First Love
Asian Music Award
Faye Wong
Special Award:
Okasan to Issho for "Dango 3 Kyodai"

See also 
50th NHK Kōhaku Uta Gassen

External links
Official Website

Japan Record Awards
Japan Record Awards
Japan Record Awards
Japan Record Awards
1999